is a passenger railway station located in the city of Shikokuchūō, Ehime Prefecture, Japan. It is operated by JR Shikoku and has the station number "Y22".

Lines
Kawanoe Station is served by the JR Shikoku Yosan Line and is located 72.2 km from the beginning of the line at Takamatsu. Yosan line local, Rapid Sunport, and Nanpū Relay services stop at the station.

The following JR Shikoku limited express services also stop at the station:

Layout
The station consists of an island platform serving two tracks. A station building houses a waiting room, shops and a JR ticket window (with a Midori no Madoguchi facility). Access to the island platform is by means of a footbridge. Various sidings and passing loops branch off the main tracks on both sides of the island platform.

Adjacent stations

History
At that time the station was operated by Japanese Government Railways, later becoming Japanese National Railways (JNR). With the privatization of JNR on 1 April 1987, control of the station passed to JR Shikoku.

Surrounding area
 Kawanoe Port
 Kawanoe Castle
 Ehime Prefectural Kawanoe High School

See also
 List of railway stations in Japan

References

External links
 Official home page
}

External links
Kawanoe Station (JR Shikoku)

Railway stations in Ehime Prefecture
Railway stations in Japan opened in 1916
Shikokuchūō